Federico Guerra may refer to:

 Federico Guerra (footballer, born 1983), Uruguayan forward
 Federico Guerra (footballer, born 1990), Argentine midfielder